Killswitch Engage is an American metalcore band from Westfield, Massachusetts. Their discography consists of eight studio albums, three video albums, and twenty-three singles. Formed in 1999, the band signed with Ferret Music, and released their self-titled debut album in 2000. They then signed a recording contract with Roadrunner Records, releasing Alive or Just Breathing in 2002. The album peaked at number 37 on the Heatseekers Albums chart. Their third album, 2004's The End of Heartache, peaked at number 21 on the Billboard 200, and sold 38,000 copies in its first week of release. The album was certified gold by the Recording Industry Association of America (RIAA) in 2007, denoting shipments of over 500,000 copies.

In 2005, Killswitch Engage was nominated for Best Metal Performance at the 47th Grammy Awards. Later that year, the band issued the video album (Set This) World Ablaze, which contained a live concert in their hometown, a documentary, and all of their music videos from 2002 to 2004. The DVD was certified gold by the RIAA in 2006 for shipments exceeding 50,000 copies. Their fourth studio album, As Daylight Dies, was released later that year and peaked at number 32 on the Billboard 200 with 60,000 copies sold in its first week. Killswitch Engage's fifth studio album, Killswitch Engage, which was released in 2009, debuted at number seven on the Billboard 200, making it their highest-charting record at that time.

The band's sixth album, Disarm the Descent, was released in 2013 and debuted at number seven on the Billboard 200. The album also charted within the top 20 in eight countries, their first album to do so. Continuing on the success of Disarm the Descent, Killswitch Engage's 2016 album Incarnate peaked at number 6 on the Billboard 200, and in the top 10 in several countries. It sold 35,000 copies in its first week of release, and is their highest-charting album to date. Later that following year the band released a two disc-set Blu-ray video album titled Beyond the Flames: Home Video Vol.2  which consist of multiple live performances around the world from 2012 to 2016, a documentary, music videos, band member profiles and a bonus live CD from their 2014 Monster Mosh show in their hometown of Worcester, Massachusetts.

Albums

Studio albums

Video albums

Singles

Music videos

References

External links
 Killswitch Engage at AllMusic
 Killswitch Engage at Discogs

Heavy metal group discographies
Discographies of American artists